Rune Massing (born 18 August 1980, Leeuwarden) is a Dutch professional badminton player. 2002 and 2003 he won the German team championships with SC Bayer 05 Uerdingen. In 2003 he was the satellite circuit winner.

On 13 June 2011 he announced his retirement as international and as member of the national league.

Career highlights

External links
Yonex Profile

Dutch male badminton players
Sportspeople from Leeuwarden
1980 births
Living people